The Honda CBR1000F Hurricane is a sport touring motorcycle, part of the CBR series manufactured by Honda from 1987 to 1996 in the United States and from 1987 to 1999 in the rest of the world. It is powered by a liquid-cooled, DOHC, 16-valve inline-four engine. The CBR1000F, along with the CBR750F and CBR600F, was Honda's first inline four-cylinder, fully-faired sport bike.

History 
Manufactured from 1987 to 1996 in the U.S. to late 1999 in the rest of the world, the Hurricane went through only three major revisions. In 1989, the bike received a cosmetic makeover with a complete redesign of the front fairing, improvements to the bike's front suspension, larger tires were added to help cope with the bike's heavy weight and to accommodate radial tires, improvements were also added to the bike's cam chain tensioner in an attempt to remove the annoying cam chain rattle some riders had reported. The 1989 model also had its power slightly increased, and it gained weight.

In 1992, the bike's looks were overhauled with a more streamlined and modern looking bodywork added. The biggest change was the introduction of DCBS, Honda's dual combined braking system. Honda’s first street motorcycle with a combined braking system (then called Unified Braking) was the 1983 Gold Wing GL1100. This system was derived from a 1970s RCB1000 world endurance race bike. 
The DCBS system was introduced to assist rider braking where the front brake lever operates two of the three pistons on the front calipers but also proportionally applies pressure to one piston of the rear brake caliper, while using the rear brake will engage one piston in front calipers and two pistons on the rear. Since then DCBS has evolved into a very popular addition to many Honda touring motorcycles. No major changes were made after 1992. A touring model was briefly launched that offered a larger screen and hard panniers. 

The CBR was weighed by Cycle World at  tank empty and  wet for California model. The engine is housed in a steel box section perimeter frame, air-assisted 41 mm telescopic front forks and an adjustable monoshock at the rear. The front brakes are twin 296 mm discs using three piston Nissin calipers on later models (two piston calipers 1987-88), the rear is a single 256 mm disc, and DCBS are used on all models after 1992.

Engine 
The CBR's engine went largely unchanged throughout its history.

The fuel tank holds .

Discontinuation 
From 1992, Honda introduced the Supersport series with the Tadao Baba developed Fireblade, which took sales from the heavier CBR1000F.

The model was hence discontinued in the USA from 1996 as the CBR1100XX was released, but continued to sell in Asian and European markets until Honda finally ended its run in late 1999.

References 

CBR1000F
Sport bikes
Motorcycles introduced in 1987